The 1965 William & Mary Indians football team was an American football team that represented the College of William & Mary as a member of the Southern Conference (SoCon) during the 1965 NCAA University Division football season. In their second season under head coach Marv Levy, the Indians compiled a 6–4 record with a mark of 5–1 in conference play, finishing second in the SoCon. The game versus VPI was the first-ever varsity football game played at Lane Stadium, but the Indians lost 9–7.

Schedule

References

William and Mary
William & Mary Tribe football seasons
William